Lian, officially the Municipality of Lian,  is a 3rd class municipality in the province of Batangas, Philippines. According to the 2020 census, it has a population of 56,280 people.

The patron saint of Lian is John the Baptist.

Geography 

According to the Philippine Statistics Authority, the municipality has a land area of  constituting  of the  total area of Batangas.

Barangays
Lian is politically subdivided into 19 barangays.

Climate 

The climate of Lian falls under the first type of classification, Type I, characterized by two pronounced seasons: Dry season from November to April and wet season for the rest of the year.

Demographics

In the 2020 census, Lian had a population of 56,280.

Economy

Government

Current Officials as of 2022:

 Mayor: Joseph V. Peji
 Vice Mayor: Ronin Leviste 
 Councilors:

 Cesar Lagus, Jr. 
 Ben Magbago
 Osita Vergara
 Arlene Lagus
 Leo Jonson
 Roland Magyaya
 Lauro Ompong
 Reynaldo Herrera, Jr.

Education

 Binubusan Christian Faith Learning Center
 Grand Prairie Learning School
 Lian Institute 
 Lian National High school 
 Senior High School in Lian
 Matabungkay National High School
 R. B Concepcion Montessori School
 Saint Anne Academy (formerly known as Binubusan Academy)
 Saint Claire Academy
 Luyahan Elementary School
 Lian Central School 
 Binubusan Elementary School
 Matabungkay Elementary School

Tourism

 Matabungkay Beach – a white sand beach accessible to Manila  that was originally 'discovered' to be a great weekend or daytrip destination in the early 1950s, allegedly by sun starved German residents of Manila. It was soon a popular target for holiday-lovers, and permanent cottages (even deluxe beach houses) were built along the beach in the early 1960s by rich Manila folk. The beach became popular because it was said to be the favorite place to release stress of a notable Teacher of Lian Jovie Ann.But since the COVID-19 epidemic began.There are more tourists than other beaches.It takes more than three hours to drive to Manila.But there is a lot of seaweed on the beach.
 Town fiesta – Lian's fiesta is held annually every June 24 to commemorate the birthdate of Saint John The Baptist. It is being celebrated by five barangays in the Poblacion, Sitio Bag-bag,  also celebrates its fiesta on this day because of its proximity to the town center than to its respective barangays, Kapito and Bungahan (Sitio Bag-bag is shared by 2 barangays).
 Balsa festival – The quaint barangay of Matabungkay is known for its wide beach, clear waters, creamy sand and the Balsa (bamboo beach raft). Every year, this small town comes alive in colorful celebrations as Matabungkay Beach Resort & Hotel hosts the Balsa Festival. The first ever Balsa Festival was held on May 18, 2002, aimed to help the local community by bringing back the town's popularity in the tourism map. With the continued support of the Department of Tourism, the Balsa Festival has become an annual event. Activities include the Balsa Race Competition, Balsa Decor and Cultural Dance Competition, a concert and dance party by the beach, prominent media personalities and foreign executives.

References

External links

[ Philippine Standard Geographic Code]

Municipalities of Batangas